Harald Leipnitz (22 April 1926 – 21 November 2000) was a German actor, who was born in Wuppertal and died in Munich of lung cancer.

Filmography 

1961: The Big Show (Uncredited)
1963: , as Wolfgang Spitz
1963: , as Pedro
1964: The Curse of the Hidden Vault, as Jimmy Flynn
1965:  (TV miniseries), as Eric Martin
1965: The Bandits of the Rio Grande, as Ryan
1965: , as Pfarrer Johannes
1965: Diamond Walkers, as Mike Johnson
1965: The Oil Prince, as The Oil Prince
1965: The Sinister Monk, as Inspector Bratt
1966: I Am Looking for a Man, as Gregor
1966: Agent 505: Death Trap in Beirut, as Fred Köhler
1966: Sperrbezirk, as Bernie Kallmann
1966: , as Siegbert 'Bert' Lahner
1966: The Brides of Fu Manchu, as Nikki Sheldon
1966: Countdown to Doomsday, as Alan Shepperton
1966: Liselotte of the Palatinate, as Herzog von Orléans
1966: Winnetou and Old Firehand, as Silers
1967: The Sweet Sins of Sexy Susan, as Ferdinand
1967: Creature with the Blue Hand, as Inspector Craig
1967: , as Golo
1967: , as Monsieur Poloni
1967: Glorious Times at the Spessart Inn, as Frank Green
1968: , as Robert Arnold
1968: Sexy Susan Sins Again, as Ferdinand
1968: Emma Hamilton, as Harry Featherstone
1968:  (24 Hour Lover), as Georg 'George' Weissborn
1969: Marquis de Sade: Justine, as Raymond
1969: House of Pleasure, as Ferdinand
1969: , as Rolf Olvedi
1970: Frau Wirtin bläst auch gern Trompete (Sexy Susan Knows How...!), as Ferdinand
1970:  (Do You Believe in Swedish Sin?), as Horst Praterweiss
1970: , as Jan
1971: , as Zahnarzt Falk
1972:  (Not Dumb, the Bird), as Victor Masson
1973: All People Will Be Brothers, as Werner Mark
1973: , as Paul Holland
1973:  The Bloody Vultures of Alaska (Hell Hounds of Alaska), as Mark Monty
1973: , as Himself
1976: Derrick: Tote Vögel singen nicht (TV), as Wirt Schermann
1976: , as Lampensiepen
1976: Vier gegen die Bank (TV film), as Peter Pagodi
1977: , as Dr. Linkers
1977: , as Oberster Kommandant (Obrist)
1977:  (TV film), as Inspector Harry Dawson
1978: , as Schnaffelmann
1980: Musik auf dem Lande, as Harry Elmau
1983: Monaco Franze (TV series), as Man with Porsche
1985: Unsere schönsten Jahre (TV series), as Seibold
1986: Kir Royal (TV series), as Puppi
1987: , as Director
1988: , as Hoteldirektor
1992: Immer Ärger mit Nicole, as Harald
1993: Cliffs of the Death (TV film), as Conrad
1993:  (TV film), as Jack Di Franco
1994-1995: Unsere Schule ist die beste (TV series), as Harald Schönauer
1995: Pizza Arrabbiata
1999: Our Island in the South Pacific, as Dr. Tietze
1999: Prosit Neujahr (directed by Leipnitz)
2001: Vortex, as Carl (final film role)

References

External links 
 
 

1926 births
2000 deaths
German male film actors
German male television actors
Deaths from lung cancer in Germany
20th-century German male actors
German Film Award winners